Hilferding is a surname. Notable people with the surname include:

Aleksander Hilferding (1831–1872), Russian linguist and folklorist
Margarete Hilferding (1871–1942), Austrian psychologist
Rudolf Hilferding (1877–1941), Austrian-German economist and politician